Eli Gras (born 1971) is a self-taught multidisciplinary artist with an important influence in the underground panorama of Barcelona, that works often in Madrid, France, Germany and the Netherlands. She founded La Olla Expréss, a publishing house, music label and cultural association. She is a composer, multi-instrumentalist, illustrator, photographer and graphic designer as well. She has collaborated in several children's books, animation films and in the production of special effects for cinema and advertising. She is also promoter of cultural projects and events. She defines herself as a specialist in conceptual hardware.

Biography 
Eli Gras was born in the Gràcia neighborhood of Barcelona in a large family. From a very early age, she already had eclectic artistic interests and a vision of the world that amazed some artists, friends of the family, who encouraged her to collaborate in artistic projects at that premature stage. It was then that she was a founder member of the experimental group Etnia (1982–1989), with Juzz S. Ubach, Alain Wergifosse and Florenci Salesas, with whom he made a concert at the headquarters of the esoteric magazine Karma 7 (1984), when she was only thirteen years old, or to participate in the radically experimental Estiu Mogut in Vilanova i la Geltrú. with a then unusual set of analogue and digital synthesizers, percussion, and self-made instruments. Throughout the decade she played with musicians from other fields, approaching other genres, such as experimental, electropop, minimalism or rebetik, she transformed with her personality. In the 90s she started making her first solo concerts while expanding her scope of collaborations. In the middle of the decade she cofounded Obmuz trio, with Quico Samsó and Alain Wergifosse and started to sophisticate the creation of their own instruments. Already at the arrival of the 21st century, she founded La Olla Expréss, a cultural association created to publish books and CDs in atypical formats, and the NoNoLogic International Festival. which he directs and coordinates making it have become a referent of the European underground panorama. From that time on, Eli Gras has also become a regular name in several European experimental music festivals such as Worldtronics, Imaxinasons, Jardines Éfemeros, Blurred Edges, Sónar, among others). She has made special works for Drap-Art and CCCB, as well as workshops and talks. As experimental luthier, she has created the "Saló Sonor" and "Peeled Piano" concert facilities, working on creative recycling and playing with a large number of artists, including Pierre Bastien, Nuno Rebelo, Pelayo Arrizabalaga, Hans-Joachim Roedelius, Eduard Altaba, Tom Chant, Aixònoespànic, Francesc Melis, Juan Matos Capote, Jaki Liebezeit, Perreko, Fred Frith, David Paredes, David Fenech, Diego Caicedo, Jakob Draminsky, Cèlia Sànchez-Mústich, Barb Wagner, Truna, Juergen Hall, Klaus Kürvers, Juan Crek, Quico Samsó,  or Alain Wergifosse.

Musical style and artistic conception 
Her music has two main sides: on one hand improvisation, in which it deprives the mysterious, often rough, environments, not exempt, however, from amusing elements that try to dilute any possible solemnity, and on the other perfectly composed and structured themes, both instrumental and sung, in whose she breaks the barriers between different genres, with a tendency towards the mixture between a certain distant coldness and the fascination for words and melodies of strong emotional character. In one area as well as in the other, the use of unusual instruments such as toys, prepared guitars, various artifacts and other instruments such as electric bass, small electronic keyboards or flutes "take life and express themselves in their own language." Eli Gras often shares her knowledge and small discoveries, sounds and processes with everyone who feel interest for, allowing the audience attending her concerts to play her instruments, apart from the workshops, didactic talks and exhibitions. She feels committed to fight against elitism and secrecy.

Literature and other disciplines 
Poetry, writing and, to a lesser extent, drawing and other disciplines, have always been part of the concerns of Eli Gras since she was a kid. In 1998 she was able to self-publish (republished in 2002 by La Olla Expréss) Cuentos de la Olla Expréss her first compilation of short stories of a strong pataphysics character. Thereafter they were followed by Mis queridos objetos y otras poeprosas (La Olla Expréss, 2002) and Sin espejos (La Olla Expréss, 2006). Her activity as a public reader of her own literary work, a lot less frequent than her musical one, has been increased in recent years, making appearances in collective readings or even creating a show of reading and music with the poet and also musician Cèlia Sànchez-Mústich, within the scope of the LEM.

Works 
Apart from his solo work, Eli Gras has been former member of several groups such as Colofonia, Kaimos, The Showers Sisters with Adele Madau, Obmuz, Etnia, Ome Acustic and, together with Florenci Salesas, Motor Combo. She is currently a former part member of the Laptopless Orchestra.

Solo works 
 2002 – Baranda LP (La Olla Expréss, Barcelona)
 2016 – Xylotheque LP (La Olla Expréss, Barcelona)
 2018 – Grass Velvet LP (Esc. Rec. Netherlands)
 2018 – Tasmanian Robinet EP (La Olla Expréss, Barcelona)
 2019 – Museum of the Dry Bugs Cassette tape + special object (Gagarin Records, Cologne)

Motor Combo 
 2003 – El avión Single (La Olla Expréss, Barcelona)
 2012 – Polo LP (La Olla Expréss, Barcelona)

Collaborations 
 1998 – Obmuz Band (Dude Tapes, Barcelona).
 1999 – Deep Gray Organics (Alain Wergifosse, Geometrik Records, Madrid).
 2009 – Baby Elephant Walk (Ego Twister Records, Angers).
 2010 – Calixto, song for Ego Twister Party Ruiners.
 2010 – Calixto, song for Music for Toys 3 (Ego Twister Records, Angers).
 2013 – Yan Lemonnier (Ego Twister Records, Angers).
 2013 – Reedición de Obmuz Band (Dude Tapes, Barcelona).
 2014 – Crek-Walters-Gras-Caicedo. Juan Matos Capote.  (El Generador).
 2015 – Duplicat (Pelayo Arrizabala & Eli Gras) (La Olla Expréss, Barcelona).
 2015 – Sound and Visual Walk (Circular Strings Sequencer).

Books 
 2006 – Cuentos de La Olla Expréss (La Olla Expréss)
 2013 – Queridos Objetos y Otras Poeprosas (La Olla Expréss)
 2013 – Sin Espejos (La Olla Expréss)

Performances, Residences 
 2012 – ''l'oscil·lar'' and Saló Sonor, at Associació Priorat Centre d'Art (Priorat, Catalonia)
 2014 – Saló Sonor, with Mar Morey, at L'Estruch Centre D'art" ( Sabadell, Catalonia)
 2015 – Peeled Piano, at Champs des Possibles, (Ferme de la Mhotte, France)
 2015 – De Perifeer, at (Deventer, the Netherlands)
 2016 – Worm creation of Xylotheque" (Rotterdam, the Netherlands)
 2016 – Conference at Universidad de Jaén (Jaén, Spain)
 2016 – Furniture Talk!'' at Elisava (Barcelona)

References

External links 
 Official website of Eli Gras
 La Olla Expréss discography at Discogs

1971 births
Living people